Jill Schupp (née Seltzer; born January 27, 1955) is an American politician and a former Democratic member of the Missouri Senate, representing the 24th district consisting of the western suburbs of St. Louis from 2015 to 2023. Previously, Schupp represented the 88th district in the Missouri House of Representatives. On December 3, 2019, she announced she would run for Missouri's 2nd congressional district in 2020.

Early life and education
Schupp graduated from Parkway North High School in Creve Coeur, Missouri and the University of Missouri in Columbia. She did subsequent graduate work at University of Missouri at St. Louis, where she received a teachers certificate. After a brief stint as a teacher she worked as a small business executive for an advertisement agency.

Political career
Schupp's political career began in 2000 as a member of the Ladue School Board, where she served for six years including two terms as President. In 2007, she was elected to the Creve Coeur City Council.

Missouri House of Representatives
Schupp was an elected member of the Missouri House of Representatives from 2008 to 2014, where she served on the Joint Committee on Life Sciences, Budget Committee, Health Insurance Committee, Higher Education Committee, and the Children, Families, and Persons with Disabilities Committee.

Missouri Senate
In 2014, Schupp was elected to the Missouri Senate. After running unopposed in the Democratic primary, she defeated Republican Jay Ashcroft and Libertarian Jim Higgins with 50% of the vote against 47% and 3% respectively. After raising over $1 million for her reelection bid, she was re-elected to the senate 2018, defeating Republican Gregory Powers. Schupp represents the 24th Senate district, which is located in St. Louis County.

At the beginning of the 2017 legislative session, Schupp served on the following committees, councils and commissions: Economic Development, Education, Health and Pensions, Professional Registration, Seniors, Families and Children, Joint Committee on Child Abuse and Neglect, Joint Committee on Tax Policy, Study Commission on State Tax Policy, Missouri Assistive Technology Advisory Council, Missouri Veterans' Commission, and MO HealthNet Oversight Committee.

2020 U.S. House election

On December 3, 2019, Schupp officially announced her campaign for the Democratic nomination to the U.S. House of Representatives against Republican incumbent Ann Wagner for Missouri's 2nd congressional district. Her state senate district covers much of the St. Louis County portion of the congressional district. She did not have to give up her state senate seat to run for Congress; her term in the state senate wasn't due to expire until 2023 (at which time she will be termed out of the chamber).

She won the Democratic primary unopposed, but she lost to Wagner by 6.4 percentage points.

Electoral history

State Representative

State Senate

United States House of Representatives

References

External links
 Senator Jill Schupp government website
 Jill Schupp for Congress campaign website
 

1955 births
21st-century American politicians
21st-century American women politicians
Jewish American people in Missouri politics
Jewish American state legislators in Missouri
Living people
Democratic Party members of the Missouri House of Representatives
Missouri city council members
Democratic Party Missouri state senators
Politicians from St. Louis County, Missouri
University of Missouri alumni
Women city councillors in Missouri
Women state legislators in Missouri
21st-century American Jews